Kolonia Kąty  is a village in the administrative district of Gmina Frampol, within Biłgoraj County, Lublin Voivodeship, in eastern Poland.

Location

References

Villages in Biłgoraj County